Śhāntinātha or Śhānti is the sixteenth  of Jainism in the present age. According to traditional accounts, he was born to King Vishvasena and Queen Aćira of the Ikshvaku dynasty in the north Indian city of Hastinapur. His birth date is the thirteenth day of the Jyest Krishna month of the Indian calendar. He ascended to the throne when he was 25 years old. After over 25,000 years on the throne, he became a Jain monk and started his penance. 

After his renunciation, the legends state Shantinatha travelled without food and sleep and after sixteen years received his first  (food) after achieving . He attained Moksha on Sammed Shikharji and became a siddha, a liberated soul which has destroyed all of its karma. 

Along with Rishabhanatha, Neminatha, Parshvanatha and Mahavira, Shantinatha is one of the five Tirthankaras who attract the most devotional worship among the Jains. His icons include the eponymous deer as his emblem, the Nandi tree, Garuda Yaksha, and Nirvani Yakshi.

Śhāntinātha is believed to be an idea of peace and tranquillity, hence prayed to avert calamities and epidemics and bestows welfare to worshippers and hymns to Śhāntinātha are recited during the last rites.

Jain tradition

According to Jain cosmology, 24 Tirthankaras have appeared on earth; Shantinatha is the sixteenth tirthankara of Avasarpiṇī (the present time cycle). A Tirthankara (ford-maker, saviour or spiritual teacher) signifies the founding of a tirtha, a passage across the sea of birth-and-death cycles.

Birth 
He was born to King Vishvasena and Queen Achira at Hastinapur on the 13th day of Jestha Krishna in the Ikshvaku clan. Before the birth of Shantinatha, Queen Achira dreamt the sixteen most auspicious dreams. According to Acharya Hemachandra, epidemics, evils and misery were destroyed when Shantinatha was in his mother's womb. According to Jain tradition, Indra named him Śhānti due to Jina's love for peace.

Life before renunciation 
Shantinatha spent 25,000 years as a youth and married a beautiful princess Yaśomatī. He ruled his kingdom for 50,000 years. During his rule, armoury was blessed with divine chakraratna. During his reign he conquered all six divisions of the earth in all directions, acquiring elephants, horses, nine-fold most precious treasures and fourteen  (jewels). Shantinatha became the fifth Chakravartin.

During his time, an epidemic of epilepsy broke out and he helped to control it. Shantinath became the idea of peace and tranquillity by averting epidemics, fire, famine, foreign invasions, robbers, etc., giving him the name of Shantinath. He is also associated with special right known as Shantikarma.

Renunciation 
 

Shantinatha, when made aware of his previous incarnations, renounced his worldly life and became a Jain ascetic. According to Jain texts, Shantinatha neither slept nor ate during his penance and meditated under nandi tree.

After achieving  he visited Somanasapur, and was offered first  (food) by King Dharma Mitra and his wife.

Nirvana and moksha 
He is said to have lived 1 lakh years and spent many years spreading his knowledge. On the 13th day of the dark half of the month Jyestha (May–June), he attained nirvana at Sammed Shikharji, known contemporaneously as the Parasnath Hills in northern Jharkhand.

The yaksha and yakshi of Shantinatha are Kimpurusha and Mahamanasi according to Digambara tradition and Garuda and Nirvani according to Śvētāmbara tradition.

Previous births 

 King Srisena was a kind hearted King well-versed in proper conduct and fulfilled the wishes of the petitioners. He had two wives, Abhinanditā and Śikhinanditā. Abhinanditā is described as the mother of his two sons Induṣeṇa and Binduṣeṇa.
 Yugalika in Uttar Kurukshetra
 Deva in Saudharma heaven.
 Amitateja, prince of Arkakirti is described as a very responsible person, who never neglected his duties as King. He became a Jain ascetic under the influence of Acharya Abhinandana.
 Heavenly deva in 10th heaven Pranat (20 sagars life span)
 Aparajit Baldeva in East Mahavideha (life span of 84,00,000 purva)

 Heavenly Indra in 12th heaven Achyuta (22 sagars life span)
 Vajrāyudha Chakri, the son of Tirthankar Kshemanakar in East Mahvideha. Vajrāyudha was named so as his mother, Lakṣmīvatī’s, dreamed of a thunderbolt as one of the fourteen auspicious dreams indicating the he would become a Vajrin (Indra). His father, Kṣemaṅkara, became an Arihant and Vajrāyudha also became a Jain ascetic.
 Heavenly deva in Navgraivayak heaven (25 sagars' life span).
 King Megharath, the son of Dhanarath in East Mahavideh in the area where Simandhar Swami is moving at present. He save a pigeon from a falcon by sacrificing his own flesh of equal weight as the dove. The dove, was diety named Sarupa who increase weight supernaturally but King Megharath remained steadfast on promise to protect him. The scenes from Megharath's life are popular in Jain art.
 Heavenly deva in Sarvartha Siddha Heaven (33 sagars life span)

 Disciples 
According to Jain texts, Cakrayudha Svami was the leader of the Shantinatha disciples.

 Legacy 

 Worship 

Śhāntinātha being an idea of peace and tranquillity, it is believed that chanting the name Śhāntinātha averts calamities and epidemics and bestows welfare to worshippers. In Shvetambar, Nirvāṉi, the yakshi of Śhāntinātha, is also associated with Shantinatha as Śhānti-devī in prayers for peace. During the last rites, recitation of Namokar Mantra and hymns to the Jina and Śhāntinātha are performed.Shanti Snaatra Puja is a special prayer for universal peace and the welfare of all living beings. During the prayer, offerings are made 27 or 108 times to Shantinatha. The Laghnu-Shanti-stavaa, compiled by Manadeva suri in the 7th century, is a hymn to Shantinatha full of tantric usage and identify Shantinatha as Siva, the Lord of Shanta. According to Jinaprabha Suri, the temples dedicated to Shantinatha existed in Kishkindha, Lanka and Trikuta.

According to Santistava compiled by Acharya Manadevasuri, the head of Shvetambar in the third century, mere recitation of Shantinath negates all bad omens, brings peace and protects devotees from problems. Santistava is considered one of the four most beautifully written stavans (hymn). Jinastotrāņi is a collection of hymn dedicated to Shantinatha along with Munisuvrata, Chandraprabha, Neminatha, Mahavira, Parshvanatha and Rishabhanatha.

Samantabhadra's Svayambhustotra praises the twenty-four tirthankaras, and its eight shlokas (songs) adore Shantinatha. One such shloka reads:

 Literature 

The Shantinatha Charitra, by Acharya Ajitprabhasuri in 14th century, describes the life of the 16th Jain Tirthankara Shantinatha. This text is the oldest example of miniature painting and has been declared as a global treasure by UNESCO. * Santyastaka is a hymn in praise of Śāntinātha composed by Acharya Pujyapada in the fifth century. Shantipurana, written around the 10th century by Sri Ponna, is considered to be one of the three gems of Kannada literature.Ajitasanti or Ajita-Śhānti-stava composed by Acharya Nandisena, a seventh century Jain monk, a famous Shvetambar hymn, has alternate verses praising Ajitnatha and Shantinatha. Mahapurusha Charitra, compiled by Merutunga in the 13th—14th centuries, talks about Shantinatha. Santikara was compiled by Munisundarasuri in the 15th century.

 Iconography 

Shantinatha is usually depicted in a sitting or standing meditative posture with the symbol of a deer or antelope beneath him. Like all , Shantinath is depicted with Shrivatsa'' and downcast eyes.

Colossal statues 
The  statue of Shantinath at Prachin Bada Mandir, Hastinapur and Shantinath Jinalaya, Shri Mahavirji. Aggalayya Gutta in Warangal has a  image carved in 11th century CE. The  statue of Shantinath at Bhojpur Jain Temple. 

Aharji enshrines a  idol installed in 1180 CE. Shantinatha basadi, Halebidu houses a  idol. Naugaza Digambar Jain temple in Alwar has  colossi dated 922 CE. The  image at Shantinatha temple, Khajuraho and Shantinath Basadi, Chandragiri. The  statue in Bahuriband and Pawagiri, built in the 12th century.

Famous temples 

Along with Rishabhanatha, Neminatha, Parshvanatha and Mahavira, Shantinatha is one of the five Tirthankaras who attract the most devotional worship among the Jains. Various Jain temple complexes across India feature him, and these are important pilgrimage sites in Jainism. Hastinapur, for example, is a hilly part of Uttar Pradesh, which is believed to have been a place of Shantinath, along with Aranatha and Kunthunath. Important Shantinatha temple complexes include Shantinatha Temple in Khajuraho – a UNESCO World Heritage Site, Shantinatha temple, Halebidu – tentative list for UNESCO World Heritage Site, Prachin Bada Mandir, Hastinapur, Shantinath Temple in Deogarh, Shantinatha Basadi, Jinanathapura, Shantinath Jain Teerth, Aharji Jain Teerth, Shantinath Jain temple, Kothara, Odegal basadi, Pavagiri Tirth, Kanch Mandir of Indore and Shantinath Jain Temple in Leicester, United Kingdom.

See also

God in Jainism
Arihant (Jainism)
Jainism and non-creationism

Notes

References

Citations

Sources

Books

Web 

 
 
 
 
 
 
 
 
 
 

Shantinath